Nikos Anastopoulos (born 22 January 1958) is a Greek former footballer who was one the most prolific strikers in the Greek league during the 1980s and widely regarded as one of the best strikers in the history of Greek football. With 29 goals he is the all-time top scorer for the Greece national football team. He is considered one of the greatest players in Olympiacos history, where he scored 159 goals in 291 official games for the Greek powerhouse and won the Bronze Boot as the third scorer in Europe in the 1982–83 season. Since retiring as a player he has become a football manager. The most recent club that he worked a manager is Super League 2 club Kalamata.

Club career
Anastopoulos was born on 22 January 1958. He started his career at Dafni before transferring to Panionios with whom he debuted in the Alpha Ethniki in the 1977–78 season. Thanks to Anastopoulos, Panionios won the Greek Cup in 1979 upsetting AEK Athens 3–1. His debut in European competition was also impressive as he scored twice against FC Twente and once against IFK Göteborg in the Cup-winners' Cup. His performance brought an immediate transfer offer from Twente as well as other Greek and foreign clubs. Finally, in 1980, he went to Olympiacos.

As an Olympiacos player, Anastopoulos, also known as "Moustakias" (the moustachioed one), won top scorer honours in 1982–83 season (29 goals), 1983–84 season (18 goals), 1985–86 season (19 goals) and 1986–87 season (16 goals). His goal-scoring exploits in 1982–83 won him the Bronze Boot as third scorer across Europe.

Ahead of the 1987–88 season, Anastopoulos left Greece to play for Avellino in Italy. Though he performed well in the Italian Cup, he failed to score a single goal in Serie A and returned to Greece the following season.

After coming close to signing with AEK Athens, Anastopoulos chose to return to Panionios. He later played for Olympiacos, Ionikos and closed out his career with Olympiacos (once more) after the 1993–94 season.

International career
On 21 September 1977, Anastopoulos made his debut for the Greece national team and during his playing career he was capped 75 times scoring 29 goals – more than any other Greek international. He was a member of the Greek squad in the finals of Euro 1980 and scored the only Greek goal of that competition with a header against Czechoslovakia.

Career statistics

Club

International

International goals
Scores and results list Greece's goal tally first, score column indicates score after each Anastopoulos goal.

Managerial statistics

Honours

As player
Olympiacos
 Greek Championship: 1980, 1981, 1982, 1983, 1987
 Greek Cup: 1990, 1992
 Greek Super Cup: 1992

Panionios
 Greek Cup: 1979

As coach 
PAS Giannina
 Greek Second Division: 2002

Kavala
 Greek Second Division: 2009

Aris
 Greek Third Division Group 1: 2016

Kalamata
 Third Division: 2020–21 (South Group)

OFI Crete
 Greek Second Division, third place: 2011

References

External links

1958 births
Living people
Footballers from Athens
Greek footballers
Greece international footballers
Greek football managers
Greek expatriate footballers
Greek expatriate sportspeople in Italy
Expatriate footballers in Italy
Olympiacos F.C. players
U.S. Avellino 1912 players
Aris Thessaloniki F.C. managers
A.O. Kerkyra managers
Panetolikos F.C. managers
PAS Giannina F.C. managers
Serie A players
UEFA Euro 1980 players
Panionios F.C. players
Super League Greece players
Super League Greece managers
Ionikos F.C. players
Ionikos F.C. managers
Panserraikos F.C. managers
Panachaiki F.C. managers
OFI Crete F.C. managers
Atromitos F.C. managers
Kavala F.C. managers
Association football forwards
Panelefsiniakos F.C. managers